Hibbertia serrata, commonly known as serrate-leaved guinea-flower, is a species of flowering plant in the family Dilleniaceae and is endemic to the south-west of Western Australia. It is an erect shrub with softly-hairy foliage, elliptic to wedge-shaped leaves and yellow flowers with about twenty stamens arranged around two or three glabrous carpels.

Description
There are about twenty stamens free from each other around the two or three glabrous carpels, each carpel with two ovules. Flowering occurs from August to December.

Taxonomy
Hibbertia serrata was first formally described in 1954 by Arland Tillotson Hotchkiss based on plant material he collected in Pemberton in 1953. The specific epithet (serrata) means "saw-edged", referring to the leaves.

Distribution and habitat
Serrate-leaved guinea-flower grows in a range of habitats in grey or black sand over limestone, laterite or granite-based soils. It occurs in the Jarrah Forest, Swan Coastal Plain and Warren biogeographic regions in the far south-west of Western Australia.

Conservation status
This hibbertia is classified as "not threatened" by the Government of Western Australia Department of Biodiversity, Conservation and Attractions.

References

serrata
Eudicots of Western Australia
Plants described in 1954